The Zarjoob or Zarjoub,  Gilan Province, in northern Iran is a 41 km river that passes through Rasht and empties into the Anzali Lagoon near Bandar-e Anzali on the Caspian Sea.

Pollution
Despite its short length, the Zarjoob watershed is home to about 1 million people and the river is heavily  polluted. Sources of pollution include leaching from a landfill that receives some 700 tons of waste per day, approximately 500 factories, domestic and hospital wastewater, and agricultural runoff from rice paddies.

See also

References

Rivers of Gilan Province
Landforms of Gilan Province
Tributaries of the Caspian Sea